John Pirie may refer to:
Sir John Pirie, 1st Baronet (1781–1851), British shipbroker and Lord Mayor of London
John Pirie (MP) (fl. 1401), English member of parliament for Canterbury, Kent
John Pirie (ship) built 1827, part of the First Fleet of South Australia in 1836